In radiometry, radiant flux or radiant power is the radiant energy emitted, reflected, transmitted, or received per unit time, and spectral flux or spectral power is the radiant flux per unit frequency or wavelength, depending on whether the spectrum is taken as a function of frequency or of wavelength. The SI unit of radiant flux is the watt (W), one joule per second, while that of spectral flux in frequency is the watt per hertz and that of spectral flux in wavelength is the watt per metre—commonly the watt per nanometre.

Mathematical definitions

Radiant flux
Radiant flux, denoted Φe ('e' for "energetic", to avoid confusion with photometric quantities), is defined as

where
t is the time;
Qe is the radiant energy flux of the field out of a closed surface ;
S is the Poynting vector, representing the current density of radiant energy;
But the time-average of the norm of the Poynting vector is used instead, because in radiometry it is the only quantity that radiation detectors are able to measure:

Spectral flux
Spectral flux in frequency, denoted Φe,ν, is defined as

where ν is the frequency.

Spectral flux in wavelength, denoted Φe,λ, is defined as

where λ is the wavelength.

SI radiometry units

See also
Luminous flux
Heat flux
Power (physics)
Radiosity (heat transfer)

References

Further reading

Power (physics)
Physical quantities
Radiometry
Temporal rates